David Abidor (nicknamed "Slabby"; born October 5, 1992) is an American soccer player who currently plays for Chicago House AC in the National Independent Soccer Association. He played college soccer for University of Dayton and Creighton University, and in 2012 was named All-America by Jewish Sports Review. He has also played for Dalkurd FF, Tulsa Roughnecks, New York Red Bulls II, FC Haka, Hapoel Petah Tikva, Hapoel Bnei Lod, and the Oakland Roots. Abidor played for Team USA at the 2013 Maccabiah Games in Israel, winning a gold medal.

Early life
He was born in Northbrook, Illinois, and is Jewish. His parents are Boris and Anna Abidor. He attended Glenbrook South High School, for which he played soccer.

Career

College and amateur
Abidor played four years of college soccer, three at Dayton University (where he was a business major) from 2011 to 2013, playing in 51 games (47 starts). He played in his senior year at Creighton University (where he was a finance major) 2014.

In 2011 he was a Preseason A-10 All-Rookie Team selection. In 2012 he was named All-America by Jewish Sports Review.

Abidor competed in the Premier Development League with both Jersey Express and IMG Academy Bradenton.

Professional
Abidor went undrafted in the 2015 MLS SuperDraft. After a trial with Real Salt Lake, Abidor moved to Swedish Division 1 side Dalkurd FF. He struggled for playing time and spent a brief time with fifth-tier side IFK Stockaryd/Rörviks IF.

He then returned to the United States with United Soccer League side Tulsa Roughnecks. Abidor made his debut for Tulsa on 27 March 2016, scoring the opening goal for his club in a 2–0 victory over Rio Grande Valley FC Toros. In his one season with Tulsa he appeared in 29 league matches scoring 1 goal.

On 21 March 2017, Abidor signed with New York Red Bulls II after joining the team for a preseason trial. He made his debut with the club on 25 March 2017, starting in a 3–3 draw with Pittsburgh Riverhounds. On 14 April 2017, Abidor scored his first goal for New York, helping the club to a 3–1 victory over Orlando City B. He left the club in December 2017 at the end of his contract.

In April 2018, Abidor joined FC Haka in Ykkönen.

In 2019 he played in Israel with Hapoel Petah Tikva and with Hapoel Bnei Lod. In 2020, Abidor then returned to the United States to join Oakland Roots SC.

Abidor signed with first-year National Independent Soccer Association club Chicago House AC, becoming the first defender to join the club.

International
Abidor played for Team USA at the 2013 Maccabiah Games in Israel, winning a gold medal.

References

External links
 
 Tulsa Roughnecks FC bio
 

1992 births
Living people
American expatriate soccer players
American emigrants to Israel
American expatriate sportspeople in Israel
American expatriate sportspeople in Finland
American expatriate sportspeople in Sweden
American men's soccer players
Association football defenders
Competitors at the 2013 Maccabiah Games
Jewish American sportspeople
Jewish footballers
Dayton Flyers men's soccer players
Creighton Bluejays men's soccer players
Jersey Express S.C. players
IMG Academy Bradenton players
Maccabiah Games gold medalists for the United States
Maccabiah Games footballers
People from Northbrook, Illinois
Dalkurd FF players
FC Tulsa players
New York Red Bulls II players
Hapoel Petah Tikva F.C. players
Hapoel Bnei Lod F.C. players
Oakland Roots SC players
Soccer players from Illinois
Sportspeople from Cook County, Illinois
USL League Two players
USL Championship players
National Independent Soccer Association players
Liga Leumit players
Expatriate footballers in Israel
Expatriate footballers in Finland
Expatriate footballers in Sweden